Jet Pilot is a 1957 American Cold War romance film directed by Josef von Sternberg and starring John Wayne and Janet Leigh. It was written and produced by Jules Furthman, and presented by Howard Hughes. Filming lasted more than eighteen months, beginning in 1949. The last day of shooting was in May 1953, but the Technicolor film was kept out of release by Hughes due to his tinkering until October 1957, by which time Hughes had sold RKO. Universal-International ended up distributing Jet Pilot.

The film went through several directorial changes, after Sternberg's work between October 1949 and February 1950. After that, Philip Cochran (supervisor of aerial sequences), Furthman, Edward Killy (unit production manager), Byron Haskin (for the model work), and Don Siegel also directed scenes (Siegel's weren't used), as did Howard Hughes himself. All were uncredited as directors or second unit directors.

Although Jet Pilot was publicized as showcasing the U.S. Air Force's latest jets, by the time it was finally shown, most of the aircraft in the film were obsolescent or obsolete, supplanted by more modern aircraft. In one aerial scene, the two lead characters fly a Lockheed F-94 Starfire to test a radar approach to intercept a propeller driven Convair B-36 bomber.

Jet Pilot was reportedly Howard Hughes's favorite film, one he watched repeatedly in his later years.

Plot
A Soviet defector lands a jet fighter aircraft on an American airstrip. The base commander, Air Force Colonel Jim Shannon (John Wayne), is surprised to find that the pilot is an attractive woman, Lieutenant Anna Marladovna (Janet Leigh). When she asks for asylum, but refuses to disclose any military information, Shannon is assigned to seduce her. They fall in love. Worried about the possibility of Anna's deportation, Jim marries her without permission.

When they return from their unauthorized honeymoon, Major General Black (Jay C. Flippen) takes Jim aside and informs him that his new wife is a spy, sent to relay information back to the USSR. The Americans decide to play along, and escalate the situation.

Shannon goes home to tell Anna that she is to be imprisoned for years, then deported when she is finally released. To save her, they hatch an escape plan, steal an aircraft, and fly to Soviet airspace. Their arrival is not shown, but Anna is criticized for allowing Shannon to crash the more advanced American aircraft when Russian fighters closed in, rather than fighting back. She says that she considered shooting him, then decided that he would be more valuable for his knowledge than the plane would have been.

While they are there, Shannon discovers that Anna is pregnant. Shannon is then assigned to help test new aircraft, a pretext for drugging him and pumping him for information about American aircraft. He learns much about Soviet capabilities from the questions he is asked, while only giving up outdated information in return. When Anna discovers this, she initially plans to turn him in, but as she learns he is to be drugged into permanent insensibility, she lets her personal feelings override her sense of duty. Finding herself under suspicion, she disposes of the agent sent to keep an eye on her, steals an aircraft, and escapes back to the West with Shannon.

Cast
As appearing in Jet Pilot, (main roles and screen credits identified):

 John Wayne as Col. Jim Shannon
 Janet Leigh as Lt. Anna Marladovna Shannon / Capt. Olga Orlief
 Jay C. Flippen as Maj. Gen. Black
 Paul Fix as Maj. Rexford
 Richard Rober as FBI Agent George Rivers
 Roland Winters as Col. Sokolov
 Hans Conried as Col. Matoff
 Ivan Triesault as Gen. Dmitri Langrad

Production
Hughes intended to make a "jet-age" Hell's Angels to the extent that the flying scenes were the most important element, and led to his obsessive re-editing that stretched into years. The lead actors fretted that the screenplay was "silly", with Wayne only taking on the role because he thought it would make a political statement, but soon realized it would become "one of the worst films" he would ever make. Wayne would later recall, "The final budget was something like four million. It was just too stupid for words."

Location filming took place primarily at Edwards Air Force Base and Hamilton Air Force Base, California, with full cooperation from the United States Air Force. Much of the filming of flying scenes was done at Edwards  using a North American B-45 Tornado bomber as a camera aircraft. Chuck Yeager, the first man to fly faster than the speed of sound, was assigned by the U.S. Air Force to fly for the film. Yeager would fly in the X-1, staged for the film cameras, on May 20, 1950.

Another senior jet pilot who flew in the movie was USAF Major Charles Rayburn Cunningham. He and another senior jet pilot, USAF Ret Lt. Col Glen M. "Johnny" Johnson, flew for John Wayne and Janet Leigh.

The F-86A Sabre jets depicted in the early sequences were actual operational aircraft of the 94th Fighter Squadron, the first unit so equipped in the USAF, shortly after their conversion to the type in 1949. Yeager would also fly the F-86A in a series of aerobatic maneuvers, under the direction of "air boss" Paul Mantz who coordinated the aerial sequences.

Location filming for the Russian air base was done at George Air Force Base, a World War II air base with many of its wartime structures still intact, giving the base a primitive appearance. The 94th FS and its parent 1st Fighter Group were actually based at George during filming, and had just finished a deployment to Ladd Air Force Base, Alaska, as depicted in the storyline.
 
The "Soviet parasite fighter" that Shannon flies is actually a Bell X-1, the first supersonic aircraft design in the world. 

The "Yak-12" at the film's beginning is a black-painted Lockheed T-33 Shooting Star.  The "mother ship" for the Soviet parasite fighter is actually a Boeing B-50, a development of the B-29. ; The black fighter that appears near the finale, taxiing on the parking ramp and behind the "mother ship" is a Northrop F-89 Scorpion.  An F-86 Sabre is used to depict a Russian chase aircraft, painted in dark colors, high visibility orange, and gray juxtaposed to obscure its actual silhouette.  The unpainted fighter that Olga is to test fly is also a Northrop F-89 Scorpion.

John Wayne's character and other characters wear both the original Army Air Forces uniform and the newer USAF blue uniform.

Reception

Critical response
Despite the obvious similarities to other successful films, including Ernst Lubitsch's Ninotchka (1939), Comrade X (1940), as well as the more recent dud, The Iron Petticoat (1956), by the time Jet Pilot hit the screens, it looked dated and received universally poor reviews. Bosley Crowther of The New York Times, referred to it as "silly and sorry", doomed by a "weak script, poor direction, and indifferent performances by all", concluding that it was far from being Hughes's next Hell's Angels. For aviation fans, even the aerial scenes were greatly reduced, as much of the principal photography had taken place early in 1950, making Jet Pilot something of a historical curiosity.

Movie historian Andrew Sarris, writing for the Museum of Modern Art (MOMA) Josef von Sternberg film retrospective, expressed a better opinion of the film than Crowther.  Categorizing Jet Pilot as a stealth comedy, Sarris praises its "humor and sensuality" as "enduringly enjoyable" despite a poor reputation among critics. He said that Sternberg "reduces the Cold War to an animated cartoon" and anticipates a number of metaphors that would appear in Stanley Kubrick's 1964 black comedy, Dr. Strangelove. Jet Pilot includes an inflight refueling sequence between aircraft flown by a Russian jet pilot (Janet Leigh) and an American pilot (John Wayne) that makes Kubrick's sequence look tame. The fighter jets become interchangeable with the characters, a comic anthropomorphism where "the planes enjoy a more active sex life than the human beings". Sarris considers Wayne and Leigh to be miscast in a Sternberg film, who were more at home in the "Ford galaxy" or the "Hitchcock universe", respectively. He concluded that however "meaningless" the film, Sternberg's Jet Pilot "soars in an ecstatic flight of speed, grace and color" and, all said, is a "highly entertaining" work.

See also    
 List of American films of 1957  
 John Wayne filmography

References
Notes

Citations

Bibliography

 Barlett, Donald L. and James B. Steele. Howard Hughes: His Life & Madness. New York:  W. W. Norton & Company, 2004. .
 Farmer, James H. "Hollywood Goes To Edwards". Air Classics, Vol. 25, No. 8, August 1989.
 Hardwick, Jack and Ed Schnepf. "A Viewer's Guide to Aviation Movies". The Making of the Great Aviation Films, General Aviation Series, Volume 2, 1989.
 Munn, Michael. John Wayne: The Man Behind the Myth. London: Robson, 2004. .
 Roberts, Randy and James S. Olson. John Wayne: American. London: Bison Books, 1997. .
 Sarris, Andrew: The Films of Josef von Sternberg. New York: Doubleday, 1966.

External links

 
  
 
 

1957 films
1950s romance films

American adventure films
Cold War aviation films
1950s spy films
American spy films
Cold War spy films
Films directed by Josef von Sternberg
Films set in California
RKO Pictures films
Films about the United States Air Force
American aviation films
Films with screenplays by Jules Furthman
Films produced by Howard Hughes
Films scored by Bronisław Kaper
1950s English-language films
1950s American films